The Firefighting Weekly or Xiaofang Zhoukan, whose full name was People's Public Security Post - Firefighting Weekly (人民公安报·消防周刊), was a Beijing-based Chinese-language firefighting newspaper published in China.

Firefighting Weekly was officially founded on January 7, 1998, and ceased publication on December 28, 2018.

History and profile
The Firefighting Weekly was a sub-paper of People's Public Security Post, and was sponsored by People's Public Security Post Agency on January 7, 1998.

On December 28, 2018, Firefighting Weekly ceased publication.

References

Defunct newspapers published in China
Publications established in 1998
1998 establishments in China
Publications disestablished in 2018